Lorenzo Lemuel Carter (born December 10, 1995) is an American football linebacker for the Atlanta Falcons of the National Football League (NFL). He played college football at Georgia, and was selected in the third round of the 2018 NFL Draft by the New York Giants.

High school career
Carter attended and played high school football at Norcross High School. He was named to the USA Today All-USA high school football team after his senior year in 2013.

College career
Carter attended and played college football at Georgia under head coaches Mark Richt and Kirby Smart. As a true freshman at Georgia, Carter played 13 games making 5 starts, and received the University of Georgia newcomer of the year award.  After the 2016 season, Carter announced that he would return to school for his senior season, despite speculation that he might declare for the 2017 NFL draft.

Professional career
Carter attended the NFL Scouting Combine and completed the majority of drills, but opted to skip the bench press, short shuttle, and three-cone drill.  Carter was a top performer among all of the edge rushers, finishing first in the broad jump, second in the 40-yard dash, and third among his position group in the vertical jump. On March 21, 2018, Carter participated at Georgia's pro day, but opted to stand on his combine numbers and only performed positional drills. He attended pre-draft visits and private workouts with the San Francisco 49ers, Denver Broncos, and Minnesota Vikings. At the conclusion of the pre-draft process, Carter was projected to be a second round pick by NFL draft experts and scouts. He was ranked as the second best outside linebacker by DraftScout.com and was ranked the fifth best defensive end by Scouts Inc.

New York Giants 
The New York Giants selected Carter in the third round (66th overall) of the 2018 NFL Draft. Carter was the eighth linebacker drafted in 2018.

On May 10, 2018, the New York Giants signed Carter to a four-year, $4.08 million contract that includes a signing bonus of $1.04 million. In Week 3, against the Houston Texans, Carter recorded his first professional sack.

In week 6 of the 2019 season against the New England Patriots, Carter forced a fumble on Tom Brady which was recovered by teammate Markus Golden who returned it for a touchdown in the 35-14 loss. He finished the season second on the team with 4.5 sacks.

Carter entered the 2020 season as one of the Giants starting pass rushers. In Week 5, he suffered a ruptured Achilles and was placed on season-ending injured reserve on October 19.

On Week 5 of the 2021 NFL season against the Dallas Cowboys Carter got his first career interception from Dak Prescott.

Atlanta Falcons
Carter signed a one-year contract with the Atlanta Falcons on March 22, 2022. In Week 2, against the defending Super Bowl champion Los Angeles Rams, Falcons linebacker Troy Andersen blocked a punt, allowing Carter to pick up the loose ball and run it back to the endzone for a special teams touchdown in the 31-27 loss. In Week 8, against the Carolina Panthers, Carter recorded a pick-six off Panthers quarterback P. J. Walker in the 37-34 win.

On March 7, 2023, Carter re-signed with the Falcons on a two-year contract.

References

External links
Georgia Bulldogs bio
College stats at Sports Reference
New York Giants bio

1995 births
Living people
People from Norcross, Georgia
Sportspeople from the Atlanta metropolitan area
Players of American football from Georgia (U.S. state)
Norcross High School alumni
Georgia Bulldogs football players
New York Giants players
African-American players of American football
American football linebackers
21st-century African-American sportspeople
Atlanta Falcons players